The Every Ghanaian Living Everywhere (EGLE) is an inactive political party in terms of elections in Ghana. It has not contested any elections since the 2004 Ghanaian general election. According to Ghanaian law, political parties must have a presence in all districts in order to remain registered, but due to lax enforcement, EGLE remains registered as a party as of 2019.

Electoral performance
In the 7 December 2004 general elections, EGLE was part of the Grand Coalition which won 4 out of 230 seats. Edward Mahama, the Grand Coalition candidate, won 1.9% of the vote in the presidential elections.

1992 elections
The EGLE party contested the 1992 presidential election in an alliance with the National Democratic Congress(NCP) and the National Democratic Congess (NDC) led by Jerry Rawlings and Every Ghanaian Living Everywhere (EGLE) led by Owuraku Amofa. The Progressive Alliance, as it was called, put forward a single candidate for president, Jerry Rawlings and a single vice president candidate, Kow Nkensen Arkaah on 3 November 1992. They won 58.4% of the popular vote and became the first President and Vice President of the Fourth Republic of Ghana.

In the 29 December 1992 Parliamentary election, the EGLE party won 1 out of 200 constituencies, becoming the third largest party in parliament.

2020 elections
The party did not field any parliamentary nor presidential candidates for the 2020 Ghanaian general election due to financial constraints. It decided to back John Mahama of the National Democratic Congress instead for president.

Parliamentary elections

Presidential elections

References

1992 establishments in Ghana
Political parties established in 1992
Defunct political parties in Ghana